The Premio Nacional de las Letras Españolas or National Prize for Spanish Literature is one of several National Prizes awarded by the Spanish Ministry of Culture. First awarded in 1984, it recognises an author's literary career. The prize is 40,000 euros.

It should not be confused with the Premios Nacionales de Literatura which are awarded for specific works published the previous year, in different categories.

Laureates

See also 
 National Prize for Literature (Spain)
 Miguel de Cervantes Prize (for a Spanish language author of any nationality).
 Premio de la Crítica Española (given by Asociación Española de Críticos Literarios to best literary works).

References

External links
Award winners 1998-2012
Award winners 1984-1997

Spanish literary awards